Ports North, the trading name of the Far North Queensland Ports Corporation Limited, is a Queensland Government statutory corporation that is responsible for the Cairns Marlin Marina and the Cairns Cityport project and the ports in Cairns, Cape Flattery, Karumba, Mourilyan, Skardon River, Quintell Beach, Thursday Island,  and , in  Queensland, Australia. Since 2017, the shareholding Ministers are the Honourable Jackie Trad, Deputy Premier, Treasurer and Minister for Aboriginal and Torres Strait Islander Partnerships, and the Honourable Mark Bailey, Minister for Transport and Main Roads.

Formerly known as the Cairns Port Authority, the corporation was responsible for the operation of the Cairns International Airport until the sale of the airport in December 2008 to a private consortium. The former authority was responsible for the Cairns Seaport and in 2009 became responsible for the regional ports of Mourilyan, Cooktown, Cape Flattery, Quintell Beach, Thursday Island, Skardon River, Karumba and Burketown.

Cairns Seaport 
The Cairns Seaport is located on Trinity Inlet. It handles cargo and passenger vessels. Passenger vessels berth at Trinity Wharf at the northern end of the port. The port is an important contributor to the city’s tourism economy. 202 international and domestic cruise ships visited in 2004/05 financial year making it the nation’s busiest cruise ship destination.

The southern end of the port, the main cargo area, handles 1.16 million tonnes of cargo yearly. Bulk cargoes include sugar and molasses (exports) and fertiliser, petroleum and LPG (imports). The port plays an important role in providing supplies to coastal communities on the Cape York Peninsula, Torres Strait and the Gulf of Carpentaria.

Cairns Marlin Marina 
The Cairns Marlin Marina is located at the entrance to Trinity Inlet near 'The Pier' Shopping Centre. It contains 264 berths and can accommodate vessels up to 130 metres in length. Many private yachts and catamarans are based at the marina, as well as a significant number of commercial tourism operators who provide tours to the Great Barrier Reef.

Cityport 

Cityport is an urban renewal development occurring at the southern end of the Cairns CBD adjacent to the seaport and centred on Trinity Wharf.

See also 

List of Queensland government agencies

Notes

References 
(CPA website Seaport Overview)
(CPA website Marlin Marina Overview)

External links 

Cairns, Queensland
Marinas in Australia
Port authorities in Australia
Transport in Queensland